Sorkheh Hesar National Park lies with an area of  and stands at an altitude of  above sea-level, near by Ray - Tehran 20th District, Tehran, Iran. The whole of this forest park, except the northeastern part has been managed by Iran Environmental Protection Organization since 1980. The major portion of this territory is a base for migrating birds during winter.

Environment

The area has semi-arid climate and the day-night temperature difference is very high. Jajrood River ( also protected) flows in this area, continues to the side of the area after passing Latyan Dam, and leaves the area in Parchin Township.

Geography

Access to this park can be gained from the Khojir Road and Qasr-e-Firoozeh Roads.

Wildlife and Hunting
Various animals live in this national park including Persian fallow deer, red fox, cape hare, Persian leopard, golden eagle, hawk, and different snakes. Although the Sorkheh Hesar park used to be a hunting ground, today any hunting activity is strictly prohibited.

References

Gallery 

National parks of Iran
Tourist attractions in Tehran Province
Geography of Tehran Province